Bob Hackett (born August 3, 1949) is a Republican member of the Ohio Senate, representing the 10th district since 2016.

Career
Hackett, a graduate of Columbia University where he played on the Columbia Lions football team, served two terms as a Madison County Commissioner and is the founder and a former managing partner of Central Ohio Financial Mgt. Group, LLC.

With incumbent Chris Widener running for the Ohio Senate, Hackett, along with Craig Saunders, opted for the Republican nomination to replace him. Ultimately, Hackett defeated Saunders with 53.34% of the electorate to move on to the general election. He went on to defeat Democrat Connie Crockett in the general election with 61.39% of the vote, winning his first term in the legislature. Hackett easily won reelection in 2010 against Aaron Kilbarger with 69.7% of the vote.

Currently, Hackett is serving on the committees of Financial Institutions, Housing, and Urban Development, Health and Aging, Insurance (as chairman) and its Subcommittee on Workers' Compensation, and Local Government.  He also is a member of the Correctional Institution Inspection Committee; and the Unemployment Compensation
Advisory Council.

A former county commissioner, Hackett said lawmakers want to do their best to help the local governments save costs and mitigate the financial hit. "Everyone knows these big cuts are coming," he said.

Ohio Senate
In early 2016, Senator Bob Hackett was appointed to the Ohio Senate to succeed Senator Chris Widener, who resigned.

Committee assignments 
During the 134th General Assembly, Hackett was assigned to the following Ohio Senate committees:

 (Chair of) Insurance Committee
 Agriculture & Natural Resources Committee
 Financial Institutions & Technology Committee
 Veterans & Public Safety Committee
 Rules & Reference Committee
 General Government Budget Committee

References

External links
 

Living people
Republican Party members of the Ohio House of Representatives
1949 births
People from London, Ohio
21st-century American politicians
Republican Party Ohio state senators
Columbia Lions football players